Beopjusa ( or Beopju temple) is a head temple of the Jogye Order of Korean Buddhism. It is situated on the slopes of Songnisan, within Songnisan National Park,  in Naesongni-myeon, Boeun County, in the province of Chungcheongbuk-do, South Korea.

It was initially constructed in 553 by Silla monk Uisin. It has been historically associated with Beopsang thought, and the worship of the Maitreya Buddha.

History

The founder, Uisin, named the temple Beopju (‘Residence of Dharma’) because a number of Indian sutras (scriptures about Dharma) he brought back with him were housed there. The temple includes more than 60 buildings and 70 hermitages, including the highest wooden pagoda in Korea, Palsangjeon.  Like most of the other buildings, this was burned to the ground in the Japanese invasions of Korea. The pagoda was reconstructed in 1624.

In the Goryeo Dynasty, this temple is said to have been home to as many as 3,000 monks.  A few facilities from this period still remain on the temple grounds, including a cistern and iron pot for serving food and water to thousands of monks.

It continued to play an important role in subsequent centuries, but shrank as the state's support for Buddhism disappeared under the Joseon Dynasty. Joseon Dynasty founder Taejo is said to have retired to a spot near Beopjusa after tiring of his sons' fighting.

Cultural assets 
Beopjusa Temple owns a number of cultural heritage items: 3 national treasures; 12 miscellaneous treasures; 21 items of tangible cultural heritage of Chungcheongbukdo; and 1 item of cultural heritage material. In addition, the temple itself is designated Historic Site No. 503, the region Scenic Site No. 61, and it is also home to two natural monuments. 
 
Among its cultural heritage possessions, one is truly unique. It is the only wooden pagoda in Korea that has preserved its original appearance, named Palsangjeon  (National Treasure No. 55). Originally there were two such structures in Korea, but when the Main Buddha Hall at Ssangbongsa Temple burnt down in 1984, Palsangjeon became the only surviving wooden pagoda designated a cultural heritage. In a hall open on four sides, the Huigyeon Bosal (The Beautiful Bodhisattva, Sudarsana) (Treasure No. 1417)  is enshrined. This bodhisattva stands on a foundation stone and carries an incense burner on his head to fulfill his vow to offer incense to the Buddha for eternity.

The Folding Screen of Celestial Charts (Treasure No. 848)  is a cultural heritage not directly related to Buddhism. Featuring 300 constellations consisting of 3,083 stars, the Charts were created by Kim Tae-seo and An Guk-bin, two scholars from the Meteorological Administration. They are based on charts their teacher, I. Koegler, made in 1723 during his stay in China. Of all the celestial charts made by Koegler, this one is the largest and most accurate, thus giving it international value as well. It is thought that these charts were given to Beopjusa Temple by King Yeongjo when the Wondang (Prayer Shrine) for the king's deceased Royal Concubine Yeongbin of the Yi Clan was established here.

Another unusual heritage is the stele of Ven. Jajeong Gukjon (慈淨國尊: 1240-1327) (Tangible Cultural Heritage of Chungcheongbukdo No. 79). A memorial to this monk who had risen to the rank of National Preceptor was inscribed on the natural stone cliff by royal decree of King Chunghye. Seonhuigung Wondang, a structure located behind the Main Buddha Hall, is the prayer shrine for Yeongbin of the Yi Clan, the mother of Crown Prince Sado and a royal concubine of King Yeongjo. Having the same name as her shrine in the Chilgung Shrine Complex (where ancestral tablets of seven royal concubines are kept), it is unusual a prayer shrine for a royal concubine be located in a temple.

Another cultural heritage relic to see is the Stone Pot, Tangible Cultural Heritage of Chungcheongbuk-do No. 204. A stone sculpture in the shape of an earthen pot, it is partially buried in the ground at a site 40 meters (131 feet) left of Chongji Seon Center. Cultural heritage experts have no idea about its purpose, but legend says it was used to store kimchi.

In popular culture
Beopjusa was chosen by Bruce Lee as the original setting for the movie Game of Death, with the five floors of Palsangjeon pagoda representing five different martial arts. Since Bruce Lee died before the movie was completed, the screenplay was changed, and Beopjusa was edited out.

Gallery

Tourism  
It also offers temple stay programs where visitors can experience Buddhist culture.

See also
Palsangjeon
Korean Buddhist temples
Korean Buddhism
Korean architecture

References

External links

Beopjusa official homepage  
Tempelstay
Oriental Architecture profile
KoreaTemple profile
Tour2Korea profile

Buddhist temples in South Korea
Boeun County
Buddhist temples of the Jogye Order
Buildings and structures in North Chungcheong Province
Religious organizations established in the 7th century
Tourist attractions in North Chungcheong Province
7th-century Buddhist temples
Religious buildings and structures completed in 653
World Heritage Sites in South Korea